The Lozva (Mansi: Лусум-я̄, Lusum-jā) is a river in Sverdlovsk Oblast in Russia. At its confluence with the Sosva, the Tavda is formed. The river freezes up in October or early November and stays icebound until late April or early May. Its main tributaries are the Pynovka, Bolshaya Yevva, Ponil, and Ivdel.

In 1590 a fort was built at Lozvinsk on the river to guard the Cherdyn Route which ran over the Urals from the Vishera to the Lozva. That outpost was endangered by a Mansi chieftain from Pelym. Lozvinsk and the Cherdyn route were abandoned after 1597 when a better route, called the Babinov Road, was found through Verkhoturye. The Dyatlov Pass incident took place near the Lozva in 1959.

References 

Rivers of Sverdlovsk Oblast